Life Left to Go is the debut studio album by American rock band SafetySuit, released on May 13, 2008, through Universal Motown Records. It was produced by Greg Archilla, who had previously collaborated with SafetySuit on their independent EP. The album produced three singles, the most successful of which were "Stay" and "Someone Like You"; both charted on several Billboard charts in 2008 and 2009. The song "Annie" was also released as a single in late 2009. The album was met with a highly positive response by critics.

Critical reception

Life Left to Go received highly favorable reviews from critics. Tom Spinelli of Melodic.net, who gave the album 4.5 stars out of 5, declared that "if you are looking for the modern rock album of the year, this may be a top contender in your collection", as "SatefySuit releases their masterful, epic debut Life Left To Go with enormous melodic power". Alternative Addiction described Life Left to Go as "easily the best debut album so far in 2008", praising both frontman Doug Brown as "an impressive vocalist...[who] absolutely gets what it takes to make a great song--good melody and good lyrics", and Dave Garofolo, whose guitar work he called "original and unorthodox...[He is] what makes SafetySuit unique".

Track listing

Personnel
Credits adapted from AllMusic

SafetySuit
Doug Brown — vocals, guitar
Dave Garofalo — guitar
Jeremy Henshaw — bass
Tate Cunningham — drums, keyboards, percussion

Other musicians
 Tommy Henriksen — keyboards
 Benjamin Muhoberac — keyboards

Technical personnel
 Greg Archilla — engineer, mixing, production, programming
 Matthew Barnett — assistant engineer
 Zach Blackstone — mixing assistant
 Doug Brown — engineer
 Bruce Carbone — A&R
 Aaron Chmielewski — engineer, mixing assistant
 George Cocchini — guitar technician
 Justin Cortelyou — engineer
 Jeremy Cowart — photography
 Tate Cunningham — programming

 Kyle Ginther — assistant engineer
 George Marino — mastering
 Andres Martinez — art direction, design, photography
 Benjamin Muhoberac — engineer
 John Netti — assistant engineer
 Rich Ramsey — assistant engineer
 Dave Salley — assistant engineer
 Andrew Shaw — mixing assistant
 Joe Spix — art direction, design
 Randy Staub — mixing
 Mickey Wade — drum technician

Charts

References

2008 debut albums
SafetySuit albums
Universal Records albums